Sergio Bianchetto (born 16 February 1939) is a retired Italian track cyclist. He is the only cyclist to win two Olympic gold medals in the tandem, which he has done in 1960 and 1964; in 1964 he also won
a silver in the 1000 m sprint. In 1964 Bianchetto and Damiano apparently lost in the semifinals to the German team 1:2, but the Germans were disqualified in the last race for moving out of their lane in the final sprint. Bianchetto won five national and two world titles, in 1961 and 1962, and set a world record over 200 m with flying start in 1960. After the 1964 Olympics he turned professional and retired in 1969.

References

1939 births
Living people
Italian male cyclists
Olympic gold medalists for Italy
Olympic silver medalists for Italy
Cyclists at the 1960 Summer Olympics
Cyclists at the 1964 Summer Olympics
Olympic cyclists of Italy
Italian track cyclists
Cyclists from the Province of Varese
Olympic medalists in cycling
Medalists at the 1960 Summer Olympics
Medalists at the 1964 Summer Olympics